Gillian Patricia Hart (born 1946) is an American geographer, best known for her books Rethinking the South African Crisis (2014), Disabling Globalization (2002), and Power, Labor, and Livelihood (1986). She graduated with a PhD from Cornell University in 1978. She is a professor emerita at the University of California, Berkley, and a professor at the University of the Witwatersrand. She received a Vega Medal from Victoria, Crown Princess of Sweden in April 2018.

References 

1946 births
Living people
American geographers
Cornell University alumni